The Tiger Makes Out is a 1967 American black comedy film directed by Arthur Hiller, and starring Eli Wallach and Anne Jackson. The plot concerns a kidnapper and his unintended victim. It marked Dustin Hoffman's film debut.

Plot
Loser Ben Harris (Eli Wallach), an alienated Greenwich Village mailman, decides to get a girl the only way he can—by kidnapping her. Putting his plan into operation one rainy night, he spots an attractive young woman. He races ahead of her and prepares an ambush. However, his would-be target finds shelter from the downpour and he ends up pulling a bag down over Gloria Fiske (Anne Jackson) instead. When he carries her back to his basement apartment and removes the bag, he is dumbfounded to find he has captured a middle-aged housewife. With no alternative, he makes do with the person he has caught, but she proves to be not quite what he envisaged.

Cast

 Eli Wallach as Benjamin "Ben" Harris
 Anne Jackson as Gloria Fiske
 Bob Dishy as Jerome "Jerry" Fiske
 John Harkins as Leo
 Ruth White as Edna Kelly
 Roland Wood as Tom Kelly
 Rae Allen as Beverly
 Sudie Bond as Miss Lane
 David Burns as Louie Ratner
 Jack Fletcher as Pawnbroker
 Bibi Osterwald as Theodora Ratner
 Charles Nelson Reilly as Mr. Henry—Registrar
 Frances Sternhagen as Woman on Bus
 Elizabeth Wilson as Receptionist
 Kim August as Toni the Songbird
 Alice Beardsley as Kentucky Neighbor
 Mariclare Costello as Rosi
 David Doyle as Marty—Housing Clerk
 Dustin Hoffman as Hap
 Michele Kesten as Waitress
 James Luisi as Pete Coppola
 Remak Ramsay as Housing Guard
 Sherman Raskin as Red Schwartzkopf
 John Ryan as Toni's Escort
 Edgar Stehli as Old Man
 Oren Stevens as Policeman

DVD
The Tiger Makes Out was released on DVD by Sony Pictures Home Entertainment on August 5, 2014, via its Choice Collection DVD-on-demand service as a Region 1 DVD.

See also
List of American films of 1967

References

External links
 
 
 
 

1967 films
1960s black comedy films
American black comedy films
Columbia Pictures films
1960s English-language films
Films about kidnapping
American films based on plays
Films directed by Arthur Hiller
Films set in New York City
Films shot in New York City
1967 comedy films
1967 drama films
1960s American films